The chub shiner (Notropis potteri) is a species of ray-finned fish in the genus Notropis. it is found in the Brazos River drainage of Texas and Red River drainage of Texas, Oklahoma, Arkansas, and Louisiana. It is also found in limited areas of the Mississippi River in Louisiana, and in lower parts of the Colorado River and Galveston Bay drainages.

References 

 Robert Jay Goldstein, Rodney W. Harper, Richard Edwards: American Aquarium Fishes. Texas A&M University Press 2000, p. 86
 

Notropis
Fish described in 1951